The 1966  Houston Oilers season was the seventh season for the Houston Oilers as a professional AFL franchise;  The team failed to improve on their previous output of 4–10, winning only three games. The Oilers failed to qualify for the playoffs for the fourth consecutive season, and were swept by the expansion Miami Dolphins.

Season schedule
Two bye weeks were necessary in 1966, as the league expanded to an odd-number (9) of teams;one team was idle each week (three teams were idle in week one).
The Oilers played each team  twice, except for two from other division (Kansas City, San Diego)

Standings

References

Houston Oilers seasons
Houston Oilers
Houston